Leino Mägi (born 22 March 1955) is an Estonian politician. He was a member of X Riigikogu and XI Riigikogu.

From 1995–2003, he was the mayor of Keila. He has been a member of Estonian Reform Party.

References

Living people
1955 births
Estonian Reform Party politicians
Members of the Riigikogu, 2003–2007
Members of the Riigikogu, 2007–2011
Mayors of places in Estonia
Tallinn University of Technology alumni
Politicians from Tallinn